Life is the debut studio album by English drum and bass duo Sigma. It was released on 4 December 2015, through 3 Beat Records.

Singles
"Rudeboy" featuring Doctor was released as the album's first single on 15 December 2013. It peaked at number 56 on the UK Singles Chart. The song only appears on the deluxe edition of the album. "Nobody to Love" was released as the album's second single on 6 April 2014. It was originally a bootleg remix of "Bound 2" by Kanye West. The song was Sigma's first UK number one and sold over 121,000 copies in the first week. It has also topped the charts in Scotland, Poland and New Zealand. In the latter country, after falling out of the chart after three weeks, it returned to the chart the following week and went straight to number one. The song has also reached the top 3 in Belgium and Ireland, and number 11 in Australia.

"Changing" featuring Paloma Faith was released as the album's third single on 14 September 2014. The song became the duo's second UK number one single. "Higher" featuring Labrinth was released as the fourth single on 22 March 2015 and peaked at number 12 in the UK. "Glitterball" featuring Ella Henderson was released on 24 July 2015 as the fifth single. It reached number four in the UK. "Redemption" was released on 2 October 2015 as the sixth single. The song is a collaboration between Sigma and Diztortion and features vocals by Jacob Banks. "Coming Home" was released as the seventh single on 6 November 2015. It is a collaborative single with Rita Ora. "Stay" was released as the eighth single on 18 March 2016.

Promotion

Tour
Sigma embarked on a ten-date tour starting on 22 October 2015 and ending on 4 November 2015.

They then announced another tour:

Track listing

Notes
 signifies a vocal producer

Charts

Certifications

References

2015 debut albums
Sigma (DJs) albums
Albums produced by TMS (production team)
Albums produced by Sigala
Albums produced by Fraser T. Smith